Muḥammad ibn Muslim al-Thaqafī al-Kūfī (Arabic: محمد بن مسلم الثقفي الكوفي) (d. 150/767-768) was a prominent companion of Muhammad al Baqir and al-sadiq and one of the People of Consensus (Ashab al-ijma). The scholars of rijal regard him as the most learned jurist among Shia hadith transmitters. According to a hadith from Jafar al-Sadiq, Muhammad b. Muslim was one of the revivers of the teachings of Muhammad al-Baqir.

early life
Muhammad was born in Kufa. He was a mawla of the tribe of Thaqif and his kunya was Abu Ja'far. In rijal sources, several epithets has been attributed to him, including al-Awqas, al-A'war, al-Haddaj, al-Qasir, al-Tahhan, al-Samman, al-Ta'ifi, and al-Thaqafi.

Scholarly Status
Muhammad studied under  Muhammad al-Baqir in Medina for four years. According to a report,  Jafar al-Sadiq counted Muhammad among the trustees of his father, al-Baqir, in matters of religion and a protector of the Shia. al-Sadiq would refer the people who were not able to stay in contact with himself to Muhammad.

According to a hadith, the Jafar al-Sadiq said about Muhammad that "None of the Shia were more knowledgeable in fiqh than Muhammad.

It is reported that great Sunni figures such as Abu Hanifa would refer to him in scholarly issues.
He heard thirty-thousand hadiths from  al-Baqir and sixteen thousand hadiths from Imam al-Sadiq.

References

 
699 births
767 deaths
Iraqi jurists
Shia hadith scholars